Y City is an unincorporated community in Scott County, Arkansas, United States. It is located at the junction of U.S. Routes 71 and 270 in the southern part of the county on Mill Creek.

References

Unincorporated communities in Scott County, Arkansas
Unincorporated communities in Arkansas